Jeannette is a rural community in Chatham-Kent, Ontario, Canada.

Communities in Chatham-Kent